Ley may refer to:

Toponyms 
 Ley (landform), name for a crag, rock or cliff in the north German language area
 Ley (crater), crater on the Moon
 Ley, Moselle, commune in France
 Ley Hill, hill in England

People 
 Ley Matampi (born 1989), Congolese professional footballer
 Ley Sander, professor of neurology and clinical epilepsy at University College London
 Ley baronets, baronetcies in England and the United Kingdom
 Francis Ley (1846–1916), 1st Baronet
 Bob Ley (born 1955), American sportscaster
 David Ley, Canadian Geographer
 Douglas Ley, American educator and politician
 Duncan Ley, Australian playwright
 Felix Ley (1909–1972), Roman Catholic bishop
 Gary Ley (born 1956), Welsh writer
 George Ley (born 1946), English footballer
 Henry Ley (1887–1962), English musician
 Herbert Ley, Jr., American doctor
 James Ley, 1st Earl of Marlborough (1552–1629), English jurist
 John Ley (1583–1662), English Puritan clergyman
 John Henry Ley (1770–1850), Clerk of the House of Commons
 Juan Manuel Ley (1933–2016), Mexican businessman
 Rick Ley (born 1948), Canadian hockey player
 Robert Ley (1890–1945), German Nazi politician
 Shaun Ley (born 1961), British journalist and BBC presenter
Sophie Ley (1849-1918), German painter
 Steven V. Ley, British chemistry professor
 Sussan Ley (born 1961), Australian politician
 Tengku Djan Ley (born 1976), Malaysian race car driver
 Terry Ley (born 1947), American baseball player
 Thomas John Ley, Australian politician
 Willy Ley (1906–1969), science writer
 Alternate romanization of Li (surname 李) among Asian Latin Americans

Other uses 
 Ley lines, a pseudoscientific belief that apparent alignments of landmarks etc. are not accidental and have spiritual significance. 
 Ley-class minehunter, a class of inshore minehunter built for the Royal Navy in the mid-1950s
 Ley farming, an agricultural system
 Lemolang language (ISO:639:I code), an Austronesian language of Sulawesi, Indonesia
 A type of pewter alloy
 La Ley (band), a Chilean rock band
 La Ley (album), the band's 1993 self-titled album
 La Ley (publisher), Argentinian law publisher
 Casa Ley, Mexican grocery store chain

See also 

 Leys (disambiguation)
 LEY (disambiguation)
 Lay (disambiguation)
 Lei (disambiguation)
 Leye (disambiguation)
 Leyes (disambiguation)
 
 
 Leyens (disambiguation)
 Cowley (surname)